Mulher de Fases is a Brazilian comedy television series based on the book "Louca por homem" by Claudia Tajes who also written the series with Pedro Furtado and Duda Tajes. It was produced by HBO Latin America in partnership with Casa de Cinema de Porto Alegre.

Cast
 Elisa Volpatto – Graça
 Antoniela Canto – Selma
 Julia Assis Brasil – Tereza
 Mira Haar – Hilda
 Rodrigo Pandolfo – Gilberto
 Giulio Lopes – major Rangel

References

External links

2011 Brazilian television series debuts
2010s Brazilian television series
Brazilian comedy television series
Portuguese-language television shows
HBO Latin America original programming
Portuguese-language HBO original programming
Television shows set in Porto Alegre